The thirteenth season of the Bleach anime series is based on Tite Kubo's Bleach manga series. The anime original season focuses on an alternative set of events in which the Soul Reaper's swords, zanpakutō, assume human forms and declare war against their wielders, led by a mysterious man named Muramasa, who is a former zanpakutō.

The season aired from July 28, 2009, to April 6, 2010 on TV Tokyo. The English adaptation of the Bleach anime is licensed by Viz Media. The season began airing on Cartoon Network's Adult Swim on November 13, 2011 in the United States, eventually joining the lineup of the newly relaunched Toonami programming block on the same network from May 27 to August 5, 2012. Aniplex released the season in a series of nine DVD volumes, each containing the first four episodes, from May 26, 2010 to January 26, 2011.

The episodes use five pieces of theme music: two opening themes and three closing themes. The first opening theme,  by Scandal, and the first ending theme, "Mad Surfer" by Kenichi Asai, are used for episodes 230 to 242. The second opening theme,  by Porno Graffitti, and the second ending theme,  by SunSet Swish, are used from episode 243 to 255. The third ending theme,  by RSP is used for episodes 256 to 265.


Episode list

References
General

Specific

2009 Japanese television seasons
2010 Japanese television seasons
Season 13